Katharine Elkus White (November 25, 1906 – April 24, 1985) was an American Democratic Party politician and diplomat, who served as Mayor of Red Bank, New Jersey from 1951 to 1956, chairwoman of the New Jersey Highway Authority (1955-1964), and United States Ambassador to Denmark (1964-1968).

Early life

White was born in 1906, the daughter of Abram Isaac Elkus and Gertrude Rosalie Hess. Her father was appointed by Woodrow Wilson to be the United States Ambassador to the Ottoman Empire. She lived in Constantinople while her father was ambassador there from 1916 to 1919. The family later settled in Red Bank, New Jersey.

She graduated from Vassar College in 1928, and on October 3, 1929 married Arthur J. White, a stockbroker who later became the executive secretary of the New York Clothing Manufacturers Exchange.  They raised two children in Red Bank (Lawrence Elkus White, b. 1931, and Frances Elkus White, b. 1933).

Political career

White became involved in local Democratic politics and unsuccessfully ran for Red Bank Borough Council in 1933, losing by thirteen votes. She also ran unsuccessfully as a Democratic candidate from Monmouth County for the State Assembly in 1934, and for Monmouth County Board of Freeholders in 1935.

She was a delegate to the Democratic National Convention in 1936, 1940, 1944, and 1948. In 1940 she became a member of the New Jersey Democratic State Committee and would later serve as vice-chair in 1954.

In 1950 she ran for Mayor of Red Bank, as the Democratic candidate in a predominantly Republican town. She defeated her Republican opponent, Stanley O. Wilkins, and was sworn in on January 1, 1951 as Red Bank's first female mayor and the first Democrat to serve in more than twenty years. She was re-elected twice, remaining Mayor until 1956.

In 1954, Governor Robert B. Meyner appointed her a commissioner of the New Jersey Highway Authority, which operated the Garden State Parkway. In 1955 she became chairman of the Highway Authority, a position she held for ten years. She was the first woman in the United States to head a toll road body.

In 1960 she ran for the 3rd congressional district in the House of Representatives, in an unsuccessful bid to unseat incumbent James C. Auchincloss. In 1961 she was named acting New Jersey State Treasurer.

Diplomatic career and later life

On March 4, 1964, at a Women's National Press Club dinner, President Lyndon Johnson announced White's appointment as United States Ambassador to Denmark. At the same time Johnson also named nine other women to federal posts, pledging an end to "stag Government."

White served as Ambassador until 1968. After her retirement, she returned to Red Bank, where she worked with local and national organizations, including the United Negro College Fund. She also served on the Board of Governors of Rutgers University from 1976 to 1980.

White died at the Riverview Medical Center in Red Bank at the age of 78.

References

External links
Katharine Elkus White in The Political Graveyard 
United States Department of State: Ambassadors to Denmark

1906 births
1985 deaths
People from Red Bank, New Jersey
Vassar College alumni
New Jersey Democrats
Ambassadors of the United States to Denmark
Jewish American people in New Jersey politics
Jewish mayors of places in the United States
Jewish women politicians
Women mayors of places in New Jersey
Mayors of Red Bank, New Jersey
20th-century American Jews
20th-century American politicians
20th-century American women politicians
American women ambassadors